The Jane and Robert Cizik School of Nursing at the University of Texas Health Science Center in Houston (UTHealth) is an American nursing education institution.

The school has graduated more than 12,000 nurses since its establishment in 1972. Its name was changed to the Jane and Robert Cizik School of Nursing at UTHealth in 2017 in recognition of a gift of $25 million that endowed scholarships, faculty chairs, and research in addition to a distinguished lecture series.

Located in the Texas Medical Center, Cizik School of Nursing's building, which also serves as a student community center for the UTHealth campus, opened in October 2004 and was awarded LEED Gold certification by the U.S. Green Building Council in 2009.

Education

Cizik School of Nursing offers programs for the Bachelor of Science in Nursing (BSN), Master of Science in Nursing (MSN), Doctor of Nursing Practice (DNP), Doctor of Philosophy (PhD) in Nursing degrees as well as a number of post-graduate certificates. The school graduates about 400 BSN nurses and 400 nurses with graduate degrees in an average year.

Students pursuing an MSN degree may choose from one of six clinical tracks: adult/gerontology acute care nurse practitioner (NP), adult/gerontology primary care nurse practitioner, family nurse practitioner, nursing leadership, and psychiatric-mental health nurse practitioner. These tracks are also offered as a post-graduate certificate program for MSN- or DNP-prepared nurses who desire additional education and/or role preparation.

The post-master's DNP track admits nurse practitioners, clinical nurse specialists, nurse anesthetists, nurse executives, and nurse informaticists. Cizik School of Nursing expanded its BSN to DNP NP tracks in fall 2019 to include family and psychiatric/mental health NP specializations and added adult/gerontology primary and acute care tracks in Fall 2020. It is the first and only public university in Texas to offer a nine-semester program from the BSN-DNP in nurse anesthesia.

Practice

The school also operates the nurse-led UT Health Services clinic, which specializes in occupational health, travel medicine, behavioral health, and nutritional therapy. It provides occupational health care for UTHealth employees and a variety of other companies and organizations throughout the Houston area.

Clinical learning experiences for students are available within other UTHealth schools and in the broader community. Cizik School of Nursing's sister institutions on the Houston campus are McGovern Medical School, UTHealth School of Public Health, UTHealth School of Dentistry, UTHealth School of Biomedical Informatics, and MD Anderson Cancer Center UTHealth Graduate School of Biomedical Sciences.

Affiliate organizations and institutions include UT Physicians, UT MD Anderson Cancer Center, UT Harris County Psychiatric Center, Memorial Hermann, and several other large hospitals and health care systems with locations in the Texas Medical Center and throughout the Houston area. Students also have opportunities for learning experiences in neighborhood health centers, nursing homes, day care centers, city and county health departments, mental health facilities, homeless shelters, and medical offices and clinics.

Research

Faculty and students within Cizik School of Nursing's Department of Research pursue scientific inquiry on a wide range of subjects, including vulnerable and underserved populations, nonpharmaceutical pain management, aging-in-place technology, and tracking and management of disease symptoms. The school also leads the University of Texas System Health Biobank collaborative. For calendar year 2020, Cizik School of Nursing was ranked 39th nationally among nursing schools with research funded by the National Institutes of Health.

Leadership

Diane M. Santa Maria, DrPH, MSN, RN, was appointed as the fifth dean in the Cizik School of Nursing's history, effective September 1, 2020].

Sources
UT School of Nursing website
web page on colleges in Houston

References

Educational institutions established in 1972
University of Texas Health Science Center at Houston schools
Nursing schools in Texas